T-lymphocyte surface antigen Ly-9 is a protein that in humans is encoded by the LY9 gene. LY9 has also recently been designated CD229 (cluster of differentiation 229).

Interactions 

LY9 has been shown to interact with SH2D1A.

References

Further reading

External links 
 

Clusters of differentiation